This is a list of fourteenth amendment cases that have been decided under the Equal Protection Clause of the Fourteenth Amendment to the United States Constitution.

United States Fourteenth Amendment case law